This is a timeline of the Era of Fragmentation, the period of Tibetan history lasting from the death of the Tibetan Empire's last emperor, Langdarma, in 842 until Drogön Chögyal Phagpa gained control over the three provinces of Tibet in 1253 under Mongol rule.

9th century

10th century

11th century

12th century

13th century

References

Bibliography
 .

 (alk. paper)

  (paperback).
 

 
 .

 

 

 
 

 

 

 
 
  
 

 
Former monarchies of Asia
.
History of Asia
Timelines of historically non-Chinese states in China